Caulanthus pilosus is a species of flowering plant in the family Brassicaceae known by the common names hairy wild cabbage and chocolate drops. It is an annual or occasionally perennial herb coated in thin hairs, especially toward the base.

Description
Caulanthus pilosus may produce many stems per plant. The leaves are oblong in shape and deeply cut into lobes, hairy, and up to 25 centimeters long. Leaves toward the top of the stem are reduced in size, sometimes linear and smooth-edged, lacking lobes. The flower is covered in thick sepals which are greenish purple to deep purple or chocolate brown, splitting to reveal the wavy-edged, light-colored petals inside.  The top cluster of flowers on each stem are sterile. The fruit is a long, narrow, upward-curving silique which may approach 18 centimeters long but is only 1–1.5mm wide.

References

External links
Jepson Manual Treatment
USDA Plants Profile
Photo gallery

pilosus
Flora of the California desert regions
Flora of the Great Basin
Plants described in 1871
Flora without expected TNC conservation status